Rolf Grünther (born 11 February 1951) is a German former professional football player and manager, who played as a centre-back.

References

1951 births
Living people
German footballers
Association football central defenders
SC Preußen Münster players
TSV 1860 Munich players
Alemannia Aachen players
Bundesliga players
2. Bundesliga players
German football managers
Alemannia Aachen managers
VfL Osnabrück managers
SV Arminia Hannover managers